Rosen Emilov (Bulgarian: Росен Емилов; born 3 August 1977) is a former Bulgarian footballer who played as a midfielder.

Biography

In his career, Emilov represented CSKA Sofia, Litex Lovech, Beroe, Slavia Sofia, Marek, Spartak Pleven, Olimpik Teteven and Dunav Ruse. During his time with Litex Lovech in the late 1990s, he was part of two title-winning teams, the first ones in the club's history. In the early 2000s, Emilov also had a spell in Turkey with Adanaspor.

References

1977 births
Living people
Bulgarian footballers
First Professional Football League (Bulgaria) players
PFC CSKA Sofia players
PFC Litex Lovech players
PFC Beroe Stara Zagora players
PFC Slavia Sofia players
PFC Marek Dupnitsa players
Adanaspor footballers
PFC Cherno More Varna players
PFC Spartak Pleven players
FC Dunav Ruse players
Bulgarian expatriate footballers
Bulgarian expatriate sportspeople in Turkey
Association football midfielders